Area 51: The Roswell Incident is a various artists compilation album released on November 18, 1997 by Purple Pyramid Records.

Reception

AllMusic awarded Area 51: The Roswell Incident four out of five stars and commended the collection for "hitting many of the genre's most seminal bands, as well as several newer ambient acts, over two budget-priced discs."

Track listing

Personnel
Adapted from the Area 51: The Roswell Incident liner notes.

Release history

References

External links 
 Area 51: The Roswell Incident at Discogs (list of releases)

1997 compilation albums
Purple Pyramid Records compilation albums